Hope and Desire is the fourth studio album by Susan Tedeschi. It was released on October 11, 2005, on the Verve Forecast label. The album is a slight step away from Tedeschi's electrifying compositions and wild guitar work, as she concentrates on singing. All songs on Hope and Desire are covers of famous soul standards.

Track listing
"You Got the Silver" (Mick Jagger, Keith Richards) - 2:52
"Soul of a Man" (Oliver Sain) - 3:15
"Lord Protect My Child" (Bob Dylan) - 4:45
"Tired of My Tears" (James E. Holiday, Lewis) - 2:42
"Share Your Love with Me" (Alfred Braggs, Deadric Malone) - 3:49
"Evidence" (George Jackson, Raymond Moore) - 3:43
"Sweet Forgiveness" (Iris DeMent) - 4:47
"Security" (Otis Redding, Wesson) - 2:56
"Loving You Is Sweeter Than Ever" (Ivy Hunter, Stevie Wonder) - 3:57
"Magnificent Sanctuary Band (feat. The Blind Boys of Alabama)" (Dorsey Burnette) - 3:01
"Follow" (Jerry Merrick) - 6:48
"The Danger Zone" (Percy Mayfield) - 2:42

Personnel
Susan Tedeschi - vocals
Paul Bryan - bass
Niki Haris - background vocals
Jean McClain - background vocals
Derek Trucks - dobro, electric guitar
Jay Bellerose - drums, percussion
Jebin Bruni - Hammond organ
Doyle Bramhall II - acoustic & electric guitar
Dave Palmer - Hammond organ, electric piano

References

Susan Tedeschi albums
2005 albums
Albums produced by Joe Henry
Covers albums